The following is a list of events and releases that happened in 2018 in music in the United States.

Notable events

January
8 – Zac Brown Band performed "The Star-Spangled Banner" and Kendrick Lamar performed the halftime show at the 2018 College Football Playoff National Championship in Atlanta.
19 – Phillip Phillips released his first album in four years, Collateral.
12 – Camila Cabello's debut solo album Camila made her the youngest artist to top the Billboard 200 with a debut set since her later-to-be boyfriend Shawn Mendes' 2015 debut Handwritten.
26 – In a legal settlement, the music publisher for "We Shall Overcome" agreed that the song is public domain.
28 – The 60th Annual Grammy Awards, hosted by James Corden, took place at Madison Square Garden in New York City. It was the first time since 2003 that the show took place in New York City. Bruno Mars took home the most awards with six including Album of the Year with 24K Magic.

February
2 – Justin Timberlake released his first album in five years, Man of the Woods.
4 – P!nk performed "The Star-Spangled Banner" and Justin Timberlake performed at halftime at Super Bowl LII at U.S. Bank Stadium in Minneapolis.
9 – MGMT released their first album in five years, Little Dark Age.
 Dashboard Confessional released Crooked Shadows, their first studio album in nearly nine years, and also their first release on the Fueled by Ramen label.

March
2 – Joan Baez released her first album in ten years, Whistle Down the Wind
 The Breeders released All Nerve, their first studio album in ten years.
11 – The 2018 iHeartRadio Music Awards took place at The Forum in Inglewood, California.
16 – Scotty McCreery released his first album in five years, Seasons Change.
 Stone Temple Pilots released their second self-titled album, their first studio album in eight years, their first with current vocalist Jeff Gutt and their first since the departures and deaths of former vocalists Scott Weiland and Chester Bennington.

April
6 – Thirty Seconds to Mars released their first album in five years, America.
11 – The Music Modernization Act, a bill that would reform how music rates are set & how songwriters and artists are paid, passes the United States House Committee on the Judiciary unanimously 32-0 
13 – John Prine released his first album of original music in thirteen years.
15 – The 53rd Academy of Country Music Awards took place at the MGM Grand Garden Arena in Las Vegas. Reba McEntire returned to host for the first time in six years.
Cardi B's debut album Invasion of Privacy debuted atop the Billboard 200 setting multiple streaming records among female acts.
20 – A Perfect Circle released their first album in fourteen years, Eat the Elephant.
J. Cole released KOD, which debuted at number one on the Billboard 200, as well as breaking the first day streaming record on Spotify, which was later broke by Post Malone's Beerbongs & Bentleys and Drake's Scorpion.
25 – The Music Modernization Act passes in the United States House of Representatives unanimously 415–0.
27 – Godsmack released their first album in four years, When Legends Rise.
27 – Janelle Monáe released her first album in five years, Dirty Computer.

May
4 – Belly released Dove, their first studio album in 23 years.
9 - Taylor Swift began her record-breaking reputation stadium tour in Glendale Arizona.
20 – The Billboard Music Awards took place at the MGM Grand Garden Arena in Las Vegas hosted by Kelly Clarkson. This was the first ceremony to air on NBC
21 – Maddie Poppe won the sixteenth season of American Idol. Caleb Lee Hutchinson is named runner up.
22 – Brynn Cartelli won the fourteenth season of The Voice. At age 15, Cartelli is the third youngest to ever win the show. Britton Buchanan was named runner up. Kyla Jade and Spensha Baker finished third and fourth place respectively.
25 – Korn frontman, Jonathan Davis released his debut solo album Black Labyrinth.

June
2 – BTS scored a #1 album on the Billboard 200 with Love Yourself 轉 'Tear', making it the highest ranking Asian album on the chart and the first foreign language #1 album since 2006.
8 – Dave Matthews Band released their first album in six years, Come Tomorrow. The album became their seventh consecutive to debut at #1 on the Billoard 200. 
Sugarland released their first album in eight years, Bigger.
15 – Christina Aguilera released her first album in six years, Liberation.
18 - Rapper XXXTentacion is murdered in Florida.
29 – Guns N' Roses rereleased Appetite for Destruction with remastered songs.

July
2 – Cardi B became the first female rapper to attain multiple number one singles on the Billboard Hot 100.
27 – Daughtry released their first album in five years, Cage to Rattle.

August
10 – Jason Mraz released his first album in four years, Know.
 Nicki Minaj released her first album in four years, Queen.
16 – The Queen of Soul, Aretha Franklin died at her home in Detroit, Michigan, at the age of 76. The official cause of death was pancreatic cancer of the neuroendocrine type.
20 – The MTV Video Music Awards took place from Radio City Music Hall in New York City.
24 – Alice in Chains released their first album in five years, Rainier Fog.

September
7 – Lenny Kravitz released his first album in four years, Raise Vibration.
 Rapper Mac Miller died in his home at the age of 26. The official cause of death was a drug overdose.
8 – BTS scored their second #1 album on the Billboard 200 with Love Yourself 結 'Answer', making them the only Asian Act to do so.
14 – Carrie Underwood released Cry Pretty, which broke multiple records. She became the first female country artist ever to top the Billboard Artist 100.
 Tony Bennett released his first collaborative album in four years, Love is Here to Stay with Diana Krall
18 – A modified version of the Music Modernization Act passes the United States Senate unanimously, sending bill back to House.
19 - For their first and only collaboration, Columbia Records releases a single between both deceased rappers Lil Peep and XXXTentacion, Falling Down. This marks XXXTentacion's first single since his untimely murder in June 2018.
21 – Slash featuring Myles Kennedy and The Conspirators released their first album in four years, Living the Dream.
24 – Cardi B extends her record for having the most number-ones for a female rapper (total of 3 so far) with the collaboration Girls Like You with Maroon 5.
25 – Music Modernization Act passes the House unanimously again. Bill sent to President Donald Trump to be signed.
28 – Mudhoney released their first album in five years, Digital Garbage.
 After a four-year delay, Lil Wayne releases Tha Carter V, which is his first album since being released from Cash Money Records in June 2018.

October
5 – Steve Perry released his first solo album in twenty-four years, Traces.
Mario released his first album in nine years, Dancing Shadows.
9 – The American Music Awards took place at the Microsoft Theatre. The show shifted from Sunday to Tuesday, and moved up from November to October. Taylor Swift opened up the show performing "I Did Something Bad" and won four awards, making her the most awarded female artist in American Music Awards history surpassing Whitney Houston and the second most awarded overall artist, just behind Michael Jackson.
11 – President Trump signs the Music Modernization Act into law.
26 – The Black Eyed Peas released their first album in eight years, Masters of the Sun Vol. 1. This is their first album without Fergie since her departure from the band in early 2018, and their first album as a trio since their 2000 album Bridging the Gap.

November
2 – Pistol Annies released their first albums in five years, Interstate Gospel.
 Tenacious D released their album in six years, Post Apocalypto.
9 – J Mascis released his first album in four years, Elastic Days.
 - Imagine Dragons released their fourth album, Origins
Lil Peep released his posthumous album Come Over When You're Sober, Pt. 2.
14 – The 52nd CMA Awards took place live from the Bridgestone Arena in Nashville, Tennessee. Brad Paisley and Carrie Underwood was hosting eleventh year in a row.
16 – Mariah Carey released her first album in four years, Caution.
The Smashing Pumpkins released Shiny and Oh So Bright, Vol. 1 / LP: No Past. No Future. No Sun., their first studio album to feature co-founder and guitarist James Iha since 2000's Machina II/The Friends & Enemies of Modern Music. Drummer Jimmy Chamberlin, who had left the band in 2009, also makes his return on this album.

December
3 – After a ten-year hiatus Hootie & the Blowfish appeared on the Today Show to announce that the band is back together, and will come out with a new album and tour in 2019.
7 – John Mellencamp released his fourth consecutive album in the last four years, Other Peoples Stuff
 – Ice Cube released his first album in eight years, Everythang's Corrupt.
14 – Bruce Springsteen released his first commercial live album in eleven years Springsteen On Broadway
18 – Chevel Shepherd won the fifteenth season of The Voice. Chris Kroeze was the runner-up. Kirk Jay and Kennedy Holmes finished third and fourth place respectively.
20 – The Recording Industry of America published the year's top certified songs and albums. Eleven albums were certified Platinum during the year, including three multi-Platinum.
21 – Reel Big Fish released their first album in six years, Life Suck's Let's Dance.

Bands reformed
Bleeding Through
Daron Malakian and Scars on Broadway
The Distillers
Framing Hanley
The Gaslight Anthem
Hootie & the Blowfish
Mötley Crüe
The Raconteurs
Static-X

Bands formed
Gone West
Kids See Ghosts
Pattern-Seeking Animals
Royal Coda

Bands on hiatus
At the Drive-In
Fifth Harmony
Hoops
Say Anything

Bands disbanded
7 Seconds
Balance and Composure
Brand New
Darkness Divided
Dirge Within
Iron Man
A Lot Like Birds
Minus the Bear
The Orwells
The Pizza Underground
Sleeping Giant
Soundgarden
The Strypes
The Thermals
Vattnet
Young and in the Way

Albums released in 2018

January

February

March

April

May

June

July

August

September

October

November

December

Top songs on record

Billboard Hot 100 No. 1 Songs
"Girls Like You" – Maroon 5 feat. Cardi B 
"God's Plan" – Drake 
"Havana" – Camila Cabello feat. Young Thug 
"I Like It" – Cardi B, Bad Bunny and J Balvin 
"In My Feelings" – Drake 
"Nice for What" – Drake 
"Perfect" – Ed Sheeran and Beyoncé 
"Psycho" – Post Malone feat. Ty Dolla Sign 
"Sad!" – XXXTentacion 
"Sicko Mode" – Travis Scott 
"Thank U, Next" – Ariana Grande 
"This Is America" – Childish Gambino

Billboard Hot 100 Top 20 Hits
All songs that reached the Top 20 on the Billboard Hot 100 chart during the year, complete with peak chart placement.

Deaths

January 1 – Betty Willis, 76, R&B singer
January 2 – Rick Hall, 86, music producer
January 3 – Josiah Boyd, 32, heavy metal bassist (A Hill to Die Upon)
January 9 – Denise LaSalle, 78, R&B singer
January 12 – Danny Woods, 73, soul singer (Chairmen of the Board)
January 15 – Edwin Hawkins, 74, gospel singer
January 20 – Fredo Santana, 27, rapper
January 23 – Lari White, 53, country singer
January 26 – Buzz Clifford, 76, pop singer
January 28 – Eddie Shaw, 80, blues saxophonist
January 30 – Mark Salling, 35, pop singer and actor
January 31 –
Del Delker, 93, gospel singer
Leah LaBelle, 31, American Idol contestant
February 2 – Dennis Edwards, 74, R&B singer
February 3 – Leon Chancler, 65, rock and jazz singer
February 7 – Pat Torpey, 64, hard rock drummer and singer
February 8 –
John Perry Barlow, 70, songwriter
Algia Mae Hinton, 88, blues singer
February 9 – Craig MacGregor, 68, rock bassist
February 11 – Tom Rapp, 70, rock singer
February 12 –
Vic Damone, 89, singer
Daryle Singletary, 46, country singer and songwriter
February 13 –
Scott Boyer, 70, rock singer and guitarist
Billy Johnson, 42, emo and noise rock drummer (Reggie and the Full Effect)
February 16 – Barbara Alston, 74, R&B singer (The Crystals)
February 19 – Norm Rogers, 69, drummer (The Jayhawks, Cows)
March 1 – Bill Burkette, 75, pop singer (The Vogues)
March 2 – Brandon Jenkins, 48, red dirt country singer, songwriter
March 12 –
Nokie Edwards, 82, guitarist
Craig Mack, 46, rapper
March 13 – Charlie Quintana, 56, rock drummer
March 14 – Steve Mandell, 76, bluegrass guitarist and banjoist
March 16 – Buell Neidlinger, 82, jazz cellist and bassist
March 18 –  Killjoy, 48, death metal singer
March 19 – Hazel Smith, 83, country singer, songwriter, and journalist
March 27 –
Bert Nievera, 81, singer (Society of Seven)
Kenny O'Dell, 73, country singer and songwriter
March 28 – Caleb Scofield, 39, bassist (Cave In, Old Man Gloom and Zozobra)
March 30 – Alias, 41, rapper and producer
April 1 – Audrey Morris, 89, jazz singer
April 4 – Don Cherry, 94, pop singer
April 5 – Cecil Taylor, 89, jazz musician
April 10 – Yvonne Staples, 80, soul singer (The Staple Singers)
April 17 – Randy Scruggs, 64, songwriter
April 20 – Avicii, 28, Swedish electronic musician, DJ, and songwriter
April 23 – Bob Dorough, 94, jazz singer and pianist
April 26 – Charles Neville, 79, R&B and jazz saxophonist
April 30 – Tim Calvert, 52, heavy metal guitarist (Forbidden, Nevermore)
May 1 – Jabo Starks, 79, funk and R&B drummer
May 4 – Tony Kinman, cowpunk singer and bassist (The Dils, Rank and File, Blackbird)
May 5 – Dick Williams, 91, pop singer
May 7 – Gayle Shepard, 81, pop singer (Shepherd Sisters)
May 10 – Ben Graves, 46, horror punk drummer (Murderdolls, Dope)
May 11 – Matt Marks, 38, classical keyboardist (Alarm Will Sound)
May 13 – Glenn Branca, 69, composer and guitarist
May 19 –
Reggie Lucas, 65, jazz guitarist and pop songwriter
Patricia Morison, 103, actress and show tunes singer
May 28 – Josh Martin, 46, grindcore guitarist (Anal Cunt)
June 2 – Wayne Secrest (68), bassist (Confederate Railroad)
June 3 – Clarence Fountain, 88, gospel singer (The Blind Boys of Alabama)
June 4 – Jalal Mansur Nuriddin, 73, spoken word poet
June 5 –
Jimmy Gonzalez, 67, Tejano singer (Mazz)
Ralph Santolla, 51, heavy metal guitarist
June 7 – Al Capps, 79, arranger, composer and record producer
June 10 – Neal E. Boyd, 42, opera singer
June 11 – Wayne Dockery, 76, jazz bassist
June 13 – D.J. Fontana, 87, rock and roll drummer
June 15 –
Nick Knox, 60, drummer
Matt Murphy, 88, blues guitarist
June 16 – Rebecca Parris, 66, jazz singer
June 18 –
XXXTentacion, 20, rapper, singer, songwriter
Jimmy Wopo, 21, rapper
June 19 – Lowrell Simon, 75, singer
June 21 – David Corcoran, 64, rock drummer (Duke Jupiter)
June 22 – Vinnie Paul, 54, heavy metal drummer (Hellyeah, Pantera, Damageplan)
June 24 – George Cameron, 70, drummer (The Left Banke)
June 26 – Ed Simmons, 101, classical conductor
June 27 – Steve Soto, 54, punk rock guitarist
June 29 – Eugene Pitt, 80, doo-wop singer (The Jive Five)
June 30 – Dean Webb, 81, mandolinist (The Dillards)
July 2 –
Henry Butler, 68, jazz pianist
Bill Watrous, 79, jazz trombonist
July 3 – Richard Swift, 41, singer songwriter
July 6 – Vince Martin, 81, folk singer
July 7 – Brett Hoffman, 51, heavy metal singer
July 8 – Tab Hunter, 86, actor and pop singer
July 15 – Theryl DeClouet, 66, jazz funk and R&B singer
July 27 – Mark Shelton, 60, heavy metal guitarist (Manilla Road)
August 2 – Neil Argo, 71, film and television composer
August 4 — Lorrie Collins, 76, singer and guitarist (The Collins Kids)
August 14 – Jill Janus, 42, heavy metal singer
August 16 – Aretha Franklin, 76, R&B/soul singer, and songwriter
August 17 – Danny Pearson, 65, soul singer
August 20 – Eddie Willis, 82, R&B/soul guitarist (The Funk Brothers)
August 22 –
Ed King, 68, guitarist, bassist (Strawberry Alarm Clock, Lynyrd Skynyrd)
Lazy Lester, 85, blues singer and guitarist
August 24 – DJ Ready Red, hip hop DJ (Geto Boys)
August 25 – Kyle Pavone, 28, heavy metal singer (We Came as Romans)
August 29 – Tony Camillo, 90, record producer and arranger (Bazuka)
September 1 – Randy Weston, 92, jazz pianist
September 4 – Don Gardner, 87, R&B Singer-Songwriter
September 5 – Nasty Savage, 50 thrash metal bass player
September 7 – Mac Miller, 26, rapper and singer
September 8 – Chelsi Smith, 43, beauty pageant winner and singer
September 10 – Johnny Strike, 70, punk singer and guitarist (Crime)
September 14 – Max Bennett, 90, jazz and pop bassist
September 16 – Big Jay McNeely, 91, saxophonist
September 28 – Marty Balin, 76, founder of Jefferson Starship and solo artist
September 29 – Otis Rush, 84, blues singer and guitarist
October 1 – Jerry Gonzalez, 69 Latin jazz trumpeter
October 3 – John Von Ohlen, 77, jazz drummer
October 4 – Hamiet Bluiett, 78, jazz saxophonist
October 5 – Bernadette Carol, 74, pop singer (The Angels)
October 8 – Tim Chandler, 48, bass guitarist
October 12 – Andrew Goessling, 59, progressive bluegrass musician (Railroad Earth)
October 17 – Oil Herbert, 48, metalcore guitarist (All That Remains)
October 18 – Randolph Hokanson, 103, classical pianist
October 24 –
Wah Wah Watson, 67, R&B funk guitarist
Tony Joe White, 75, swamp rock singer songwriter and guitarist
October 25 – Sonny Fortune, 79, jazz saxophonist
October 26 – Baba Oje, 87, rapper and musician (Arrested Development)
October 27 –
Freddie Hart, 91, country singer
Teddy Scott, 82, R&B singer (The G-Clefs)
Todd Youth, 47, rock guitarist
October 29 –
Jimmy Farrar, 67, southern rock singer
Young Greatness, 34, rapper
October 30 –
Hardy Fox, 73, avant-garde composer (The Residents)
Beverly McClellan, 49, blues and folk singer
October 31 – Kenny Marks, 67, gospel singer
November 1 – Dave Rowland, 74, country singer (Dave & Sugar)
November 2 – Roy Hargrove, 49, jazz trumpeter
November 3 –
Thomas Diaz, 32, emo singer (The World Is a Beautiful Place & I Am No Longer Afraid to Die)
Glenn Schwartz, 77, R&B guitarist
November 4 – Josh Fauver, 39, indie rock bassist
November 7 – Scott Herrick, pop singer (The Arbors)
November 15 – Roy Clark, 85, country singer, songwriter, host of Hee Haw
November 17 – Cyril Pahinui, 68, Hawaiian guitarist
November 21 – Devin Lima, 41, pop singer (LFO)
November 27 – Johnny Maddox, 91, Pianist
November 28 – Roger Neumann, 77, jazz saxophonist
November 29 – Erik Lindmark, 46, death metal singer and guitarist (Deeds of Flesh)
December 1 –
Jody Williams, 83, blues musician
Calvin Newborn, 85, jazz guitarist
December 2 – Perry Robinson, 80, jazz musician
December 6 – Ace Cannon, 84, saxophonist
December 7 –
The Mascara Snake, 70, avant-garde clarinetist
Lucas Starr, 34, metalcore and Christian guitarist
December 13 – Nancy Wilson, 81, jazz singer
December 14 – Joe Osborne, 81, bass guitarist
December 15 – Jerry Chesnut, 87, songwriter
December 22 – Jimmy Work, 94, country singer-songwriter
December 24 –
James Calvin Wilsey, 61, rock guitarist
Jerry Riopelle, 77, singer-songwriter, musician, record producer

See also
2010s in music

References